Tijana Krstić (born 4 January 1995) is a Serbian football defender, currently playing for KR in the Besta-deild kvenna in Iceland.

Honours 
Spartak Subotica
Winner
 Serbian Super Liga (4): 2012–13, 2013–14, 2014–15, 2015–16
 Serbian Women's Cup (4): 2012–13, 2013–14, 2014–15, 2015–16

External links 
 
 UEFA Statistics
 Serbian national team profile 
 Playmakerstats
 

1995 births
Living people
Women's association football defenders
Serbian women's footballers
Serbia women's international footballers
Serbian expatriate footballers
Serbian expatriate sportspeople in Slovenia
Expatriate women's footballers in Slovenia
ŽFK Spartak Subotica players
ŽNK Mura players
ŽFK Mašinac PZP Niš players